Watlack Hills is a line of mainly ice-free hills, 10 nautical miles (18 km) long, bounded by the White Escarpment, Splettstoesser Glacier, and Dobbratz Glacier, in the Heritage Range. Named by the University of Minnesota Geological Party to these mountains, 1963–64, for Chief Warrant Officer Richard G. Watlack, a pilot with the 62nd Transportation Detachment, who assisted the party.

See also
Geographical features include:

 Carnell Peak
 Dobbratz Glacier
 Mount Twiss
 Skelly Peak

Hills of Ellsworth Land